is an arcade collectible card game in Bandai's Data Carddass line of machines, which launched in October 2012. The game revolves around using collectible cards featuring various clothes to help aspiring idols pass auditions. An anime television adaptation by Sunrise began airing on TV Tokyo from October 8, 2012 (Tokyo MX is rebroadcasting the anime in 2019). In 2015, production switched from Sunrise to the studio's subsidiary Bandai Namco Pictures. Two films were released in December 2014 and August 2015 respectively. Three manga adaptations have been published by Shogakukan, along with four Nintendo 3DS games published by Bandai Namco Games. The series was succeeded by Aikatsu Stars! on April 7, 2016.

Plot

To participate in these auditions, players use Aikatsu cards, special cards which contain digitized dresses and accessories from various manufacturers that are used in their auditions. How well they succeed is often dependent on choosing the right combination of cards. The video games cast players in the role of a new student, who must train to become an idol and reach the top.

The anime series follows a girl named Ichigo Hoshimiya, who becomes inspired by a performance by top idol Mizuki Kanzaki and enrolls in Starlight Academy alongside her best friend, Aoi Kiriya. Along with their classmate, Ran Shibuki, Ichigo and Aoi spend each day training for auditions and aiming to become top idols.

The second season starts with Ichigo returning from America to Starlight Academy, as she now befriends and competes with the students from a new idol school, Dream Academy, which has Seira Otoshiro and her fellow idols.

The third season focuses on a new generation, featuring Akari Ōzora, a young girl chosen by Ichigo to join Starlight Academy, and her friends. They do their best in both the Partner's Cup & the Great Starlight School Festival.

The fourth season centers around Akari's new unit with Sumire Hikami and Hinaki Shinjo, Luminas, going on a nationwide tour and meeting with idols from all over Japan. With these meetings, it prepares them for the big event - The Starlight Queen Cup.

Terminology

Aikatsu Cards are cards that contain digitised clothes which are worn by idols during performances and auditions. They are divided into four categories: Tops, Bottoms, Shoes and Accessories, with some cards, such as one piece dresses, eliminating the need for others. The clothes come from various types of brands and have varying degrees of rarity. Although most clothes come in specific coordinations, players are also able to mix and match different cards to find a good combination.

A student ID that represents a student of Starlight Academy, Dream Academy, Himezakura Private Girls' Academy or Étoile Academy and is required to access the Aikatsu System. In the arcade game, these are IC Cards used to store a player's history and create original characters. 
In the actual arcade game, student cards are represented by Data Carddass (DCD) System's IC cards with Starlight Academy pattern. Players may use DCD IC cards to save gameplay and create avatar character. 

The system in which Aikatsu Cards are utilised. When performing in an audition or performance, idols step through a dressing room, which requires them to insert their student pass and choice of Aikatsu Cards, where they put on their selected clothes. The stage they walk on is largely digitised, providing various holographic displays and special effects during the performance and allowing people to participate in the audience via online streaming. The system reads the emotions of spectators, along with the online spectators, to rate each idols performance, which determines their success during auditions.

A handheld phone issued to each student of Starlight Academy. As well as providing various smartphone functions, such as calls, maps and a social network service, the Aikatsu Phone allows students to schedule and apply for auditions, as well as store and utilise their Aikatsu Cards for various purposes, such as holographically trying out coords. There are also a set of lights that are lit up when a student achieves a symbol pertaining to a certain idol quality.

A Special Appeal is a technique that is used during a performance, bring an illusion the stage. The types of appeal that can be performed vary depending on the types of clothes worn. Normally, idols are only able to perform a maximum of two or three Special Appeals during a performance, but Mizuki has been able to perform four, which considered to be Legends.

Fashion companies, each managed by a top designer, who design clothes for idols and convert them into Aikatsu Cards that can be used by the Aikatsu System. There are nineteen known brands in the first series: Angely Sugar, Futuring Girl, Spicy Ageha, Happy Rainbow, LoLi GoThiC, Aurora Fantasy, Love Queen, Magical Toy, Swing ROCK, Bohemian Sky, Vivid Kiss, Love Moonrise, Dreamy Crown, Sangria Rosa, Sakurairo Kaden, Dance Fusion, Retro Clover, Dolly Devil and Mecha PaniQ.

The brand new line of dresses made from the top designers who teamed up to come up with it. A Constellation Appeal is a technique that is used during a performance like a Special Appeal but is only performed when wearing Constellation dresses. This is performed when the performer has maxed out the audience's voltage meter before they can perform the appeal.

Media

Video games
The Aikatsu! arcade game from Bandai began appearing in Japanese arcades from October 2012 as part of its Data Carddass line. The game revolves around using collectible cards to help idols pass their auditions. A handheld title, was released for the Nintendo 3DS on November 15, 2012. A second 3DS game, titled , released on November 21, 2013. A third 3DS game, titled , released on December 4, 2014. A fourth 3DS game, titled , released on November 26, 2015.

Anime

An anime television series produced by Sunrise began airing on TV Tokyo from October 8, 2012, replacing Yu-Gi-Oh! Zexal in its initial timeslot. A second season began airing from October 3, 2013, with a third to begin airing in October 2014. Daisuki began streaming the series from September 4, 2014. Sunrise's director, Masayuki Ozaki, has stated Aikatsu may be considered for a US release if fans are vocal enough about it.

The second series of the Aikatsu! franchise, Aikatsu Stars! started on April 7, 2016 to March 29, 2018. 

The third series, Aikatsu Friends! started on April 5, 2018 to September 26, 2019 and the fourth series, Aikatsu on Parade!, which’s also a direct sequel to Aikatsu Friends, started on October 5, 2019 to July 11, 2020. 

The fifth and final series, also the first series produced the Tokusatsu of the franchise, called Aikatsu Planet! started on January 10, 2021 to June 27, 2021.

Films
An animated film based on the series was released on December 13, 2014.

A second film, Aikatsu! Music Awards - The Show Where Everyone Gets an Award!, was released on August 22, 2015. 

An Aikatsu Stars! film, Aikatsu Stars! The Movie, double-billed with the third film, Aikatsu! The Targeted Magical Aikatsu Card, was released on August 13, 2016,

An Aikatsu Planet! film, Aikatsu Planet! The Movie, double-billed with the 25-minute short film version of the fourth film, Aikatsu! 10th Story ~Starway to the Future~, was released on July 15, 2022. and in the same date, it was announced that the feature film version of Starway to the Future is in development. in November 2, the release date for the film was slated for January 20, 2023.

Drama CD
A Drama CD, Aikatsu! Great Starmiya Ichigo Festival: After-party Special!, was released alongside with Aikatsu! The Movie.

Music

The series contains a variety of theme songs and insert songs. Many of the songs are composed and arranged by monaca, and performed by members of the Japanese idol group STAR☆ANIS or AIKATSU☆STARS! who provide the singing voices for the characters. Some of the insert songs are the theme songs but sung by different members from the opening or closing. The songs have been compiled into several albums and performed in several live concerts.

Anime opening theme songs
 "Signalize!" (Episode 1 – 25) by Waka, Fūri, Sunao, and Risuko
  (Episode 26 – 50) by Waka, Fūri, and Sunao
 "KIRA☆Power" (Episode 51 – 75) by Waka, Fūri, and Sunao 
 "SHINING LINE*" (Episode 76 – 101) by Waka, Fūri and Yuna
 "Du-Du-Wa DO IT!!" (Episode 102 – 126) by Ruka, Mona, Miki, and Waka
 "Lovely Party Collection" (Episode 127 – 152) by Ruka, Mona, and Miki
 "START DASH SENSATION" (Episode 153 – 178) by Ruka, Mona, and Miki

Anime ending theme songs
  (Episode 1 – 25 and Episode 125) by Waka, Fūri, and Sunao
  (Episode 26 – 43 and Episode 45 – 50) by Waka, Fūri, Sunao, Remi, Moe, Eri, Yuna, and Risuko
  (Episode 44) by Rey
  (Episode 51 – 75) by Waka, Fūri, Sunao, Remi, Moe, Eri, Yuna, and Risuko
 "Precious" (Episode 76 – 101) by Risuko, Waka, Fūri and Mona
 "Good morning my dream" (Episode 102 – 124 and Episode 126) by Ruka, Mona, and Miki
  (Episode 127 – 152) by Mona, Ruka, and Miki
 "lucky train!" (Episode 153 – 178) by Ruka, Mona, and Miki

Printed media
Three manga adaptations has been published by Shogakukan. Two series illustrated by Banbi Shirayuki were published in Ciao and the Official Fanbook respectively. A third series, written by Shiori Kanaki and illustrated by Akane, was serialized in Pucchigumi. Six volumes of  has been released under Ciao Mook. A light novel adaptation also began publication starting August 8, 2013, featuring illustrations by Kyō Nagiri.

Events
Events held for the all Aikatsu series as:
 Aikatsu Music Festa 2016
 Aikatsu Music Festa 2017
 Aikatsu Music Festa 2018
 Aikatsu Series 5th Festival
 Aikatsu Orchestra Concert: Orchekatsu
 Aikatsu Stars Special Live Tour 2018: Music of Dream
 STAR ANIS Special Live 2015
 AIKATSU STARS Special Live 2015
 BEST FRIENDS Special Live Tour: Thanks OK
  Aikatsu Music Festa Final 2022

Reception
Rebecca Silverman from Anime News Network (ANN) commented that the anime series is "really a half-hour commercial for a card game aimed at elementary-aged girls, or at least it seems that way", but despite this she noted "there's something fun about this show and its toy-bright colors". Silverman said Aikatsu! is a show for someone "looking for some brainless fun with a toe-tapping yet saccharine soundtrack, you're a seven-year-old girl, or if you just really like the color pink". Theron Martin also from ANN described it as "essentially a complement to a like-named card game aimed at teen and preteen girls". ANN's Carlo Santos agreed that it's a commercial-like anime, but also criticized the animation, saying the "quality is barely enough to get by, and the character designs look oddly outdated." Carl Kimlinger's opinion was less negative as he said Aikatsu! "isn't terrible by any stretch, but it doesn't make even a desultory effort to differentiate itself from the dozens of other shows that use aspiring idols to sell games and figurines and god knows what else" and that "character designs also have a lovely shōjo flavor, and the whole series looks just as pink and pretty as can be." He finished telling it will be "a highly tolerable diversion" for those who like this kind of anime.

The film earned ¥172,727,250 at the Japanese box office on its first weekend. As of February 21, 2016, it had grossed  in South Korea.

See also
 
 Aikatsu Stars!
 Aikatsu Friends!
 Aikatsu on Parade!
 Aikatsu Planet!

References

External links
 Official card game website 
 Official anime website 
 Official movie website  
 TV Tokyo's anime website 
 

 
2012 anime television series debuts
2012 video games
2014 anime films
2015 3D films
2015 anime films
Anime films based on video games
Arcade video games
Bandai Namco games
Bandai Namco Pictures
Bandai Namco franchises
Card games introduced in 2012
Japanese 3D films
Japanese card games
Japanese idols in anime and manga
Music in anime and manga
Dance in anime and manga
Nintendo 3DS games
Shogakukan manga
Shōjo manga
Sunrise (company)
TV Tokyo original programming
Video games developed in Japan
H.a.n.d. games